This is a list of seasons played by Hakoah Tel Aviv, from 1934 (when the club was established) to 1962, when the club played its last season under the name Hakoah Tel Aviv, before merging with Maccabi Ramat Gan to form Hakoah Maccabi Ramat Gan. It details the club's achievements in major competitions, and the top scorers for each season, if available. Top scorers in bold were also the top scorers in the Israeli league that season. Records of minor competitions such as the Lilian Cup are not included due to them being considered of less importance than the State Cup and the Toto Cup.

History
A club called Hakoah Tel Aviv existed as early as 1923, taking part in a regional league played in the Tel Aviv region, finishing 7th. In 1934, a new Hakoah Tel Aviv was established by former members of Hakoah Berlin. The club joined the EIFA and the Palestine League. The club played at the top division until 1945. In December 1946 the club merged with Hakoah 09 Tel Aviv, a club established by former members of Hakoah Vienna in 1943, and relegated to play in the second division. The club played in the second division until winning the division in 1962, after which the club merged with Maccabi Ramat Gan to form Haokoah Maccabi Ramat Gan.

Seasons

Key

 P = Played
 W = Games won
 D = Games drawn
 L = Games lost
 F = Goals for
 A = Goals against
 Pts = Points
 Pos = Final position

 Pal. League = Palestine League
 Alef = Liga Alef (1st tier 1947 to 1955; 2nd tier 1955 to 1977; 3rd tier 1977 to 2000 and since 2009)
 Bet = Liga Bet (2nd tier 1947 to 1955; 3rd tier 1955 to 1977; 4th tier 1977 to 2000 and since 2009)

 R1 = Round 1
 R2 = Round 2
 R3 = Round 3
 R4 = Round 4
 R5 = Round 5
 R6 = Round 6
 R7 = Round 7
 R8 = Round 8
 R9 = Round 9
 QF = Quarter-finals
 SF = Semi-finals
 Group = Group stage

Notes

References

Hakoah Tel Aviv F.C.
Hakoah Tel Aviv